Banka Zotova is an island in the Sea of Okhotsk near the coast of Sakhalin. 

The island is roughly 1.5 miles across at widest point. Administratively it belongs to Sakhalin Oblast.

References

Islands of the Sea of Okhotsk
Islands of the Russian Far East
Uninhabited islands of Russia